Tibet House US (THUS) is a Tibetan cultural preservation and education 501(c)(3) nonprofit founded in 1987 in New York City by a group of Westerners after the Fourteenth Dalai Lama, Tenzin Gyatso, expressed his wish to establish a cultural institution to build awareness of Tibetan culture.

Part of a worldwide network of Tibet Houses, Tibet House US focuses on the promotion and preservation of Tibetan culture, contemporary and traditional knowledge, and cultural expressions through education on philosophy, cognitive or mind science based on the workings of mind and emotions, techniques of mediation and mental transformation, and contemporary and ancient arts and culture. THUS also serves as a meeting place for local Tibetan and Tibetan Buddhist community programs and events. These are presented to the public onsite and online via:
 Lectures, classes, and workshops on mind science, philosophy and meditation classes, with teachers from many traditions including the Dalai Lama, Deepak Chopra, and psychiatrists and meditation teachers such as Mark Epstein, Joe Loizzo and Sharon Salzberg.
 A gallery that presents a rotating permanent collection and multiple exhibitions yearly of modern and ancient works from Buddhist cultures including Tibet, Mongolia, Korea, Japan, and Russia.
 Museum exhibitions, conferences,
 Print publications and media productions include online courses, conferences and books. a graphic novel biography of the Dalai Lama, Man of Peace: The Illustrated Life Story of the Dalai Lama of Tibet, and a quarterly magazine.
 Lectures and events for the Tibetan community.
 A traditional Tibetan shrine room.
 A lending library of books and videos.
 Online digital archives.
 Tours to areas of Buddhist cultural influence.

Mission

At the Tibet House inauguration in 1987 the 14th Dalai Lama "stated his wish for a long-term cultural institution to ensure the survival of Tibetan civilization and culture, whatever the political destiny of the six million people of Tibet itself." THUS works to preserve Tibet's intangible culture heritage when it is threatened inside and outside Tibet, and presents a contemporary understanding of the contributions of a minority culture endangered by ever "more assimilationist policies, designed to absorb these minorities into the fold of one Chinese nation, "although The Constitution of the People's Republic of China stipulates: "All ethnic groups in the People's Republic of China are equal. The state protects the lawful rights and interests of the ethnic minorities and upholds and develops a relationship of equality, unity and mutual assistance among all of China's ethnic groups. Discrimination against and oppression of any ethnic group are prohibited ...and they have the freedom to preserve or change their own folkways and customs."

History
In 1959, soon after escaping the Chinese invasion of Tibet to India, the 14th Dalai Lama while addressing a group of fellow refugees stated "The great job ahead of us now is to preserve our religion and culture." In 1987, "a group of Westerners sympathetic to the Tibetan cause," Columbia University professor and THUS President Robert Thurman, the first western Buddhist monk, actor and Chairman of the International Campaign for Tibet, Richard Gere, and classical composer and THUS Vice President Philip Glass, founded the organization to preserve, protect and present the cultural and religious heritage of Tibet, and give a contemporary understanding of the contributions this endangered culture offers, in the Flatiron district of New York City. Frances Thargay, while working at the Office of Tibet in New York as Executive Assistant to the Dalai Lama's Representative to the US, Tenzin Tethong, wrote the first draft of Richard Gere's proposal for Tibet House. Managing Director Nena Thurman initiated the annual benefit concert with Glass, and the annual benefit auction. She is also the Executive Chairwoman of the THUS project, Menla Retreat.

THUS has worked with many different educational and cultural institutions.  This includes sponsoring teachings in New York City by the Dalai Lama. The Newark Peace Education Summit, a three-day conference in 2011, focused on the policies and methods used by communities to establish peace. Participants included the Dalai Lama and fellow Nobel Laureates, anti-landmine activist Jody Williams, and Iranian civil rights activist Shirin Ebadi; Cory Booker, Martin Luther King III, economist Jeffrey Sachs, Deepak Chopra, Rabbi Michael Lerner; anthropologist Wade Davis, who shared a stage with representatives of the Navajo, Dene, and Hopi nations; and many other international and local activists. The Global Vision Summit was started in 2020. Twenty-one teachers, spiritual leaders, scholars, and students of the 14th Dalai Lama, including Richard Gere, Thupten Jinpa, Richard Davidson, and Daniel Goleman discussed his life and teachings with over 90,000 people worldwide. In 2021 the 2nd Annual Dalai Lama Global Vision Summit, “The Power of Compassion,” examined the Dalai Lama's vision and practice of compassion.  Participants included Daniel Goleman, Marina Abramović, Jan Willis, Mark Hyman, and Tara Brach.

THUS has published many books including A Shrine for Tibet: The Alice S. Kandell Collection, "a visual knockout of a book," the accompanying publication for the traveling exhibition In the Realm of the Buddha at the Smithsonian. In collaboration with The American Institute of Buddhist Studies at Columbia University, the complete translation of the "originally Indian Buddhist artistic, scientific, and religious works collected in the Tibetan Tengyur," and associated translations, studies and reference works, including the "Treasury of Buddhist Sciences: Associated Literature" and "Treasury of Indic Sciences" series, have been published.

The Art of Freedom Award, honoring outstanding contributions reflecting THUS' mission, has been presented to author and human rights advocate Eliot Pattison, director Martin Scorsese, and artist Roy Lichtenstein, among others. THUS presented "Transforming Minds: Kyabje Gelek Rimpoche and Friends," with the Allen Ginsberg Estate and Jewel Heart International in 2021. The gallery and online exhibition of never before seen images by Ginsberg of Gelek Rimpoche and great masters, Tibetologists, and students exemplified the transformational nature of this time in US history.

Fundraising events include a yearly auction and dinner, and a benefit concert at Carnegie Hall organized by Philip Glass, "rich with monumental figures." "A New York institution," held since 1989, the concert and dinner party celebrates Losar, the Tibetan New Year. Featured musicians and performers include  Patti Smith, David Bowie, Allen Ginsberg, Laurie Anderson, Lou Reed, Iggy Pop, Björk, Debbie Harry, Taj Mahal, Paul Simon, Ray Davies, Richie Havens, John Cale, Emmylou Havens, Billy Corgan, Sufjan Stevens, Nawang Khechog, Trey Anastasio, Shawn Colvin, Jimmy Dale Gilmore, David Byrne, Gogol Bordello, FKA Twigs, Annie Lennox, Eddie Vedder, Phoebe Bridgers, Tenzin Choegyal, Bettye LaVette, Dadon, The Flaming Lips, Michael Stipe, Sheryl Crow, Moby, Sigur Rós, Ashley McIsaac, Bright Eyes, Lenny Kaye, Natalie Merchant, Angélique Kidjo, Foday Musa Suso, Caetano Veloso, the Drepung Loseling Monks, Regina Spektor, Pierce Turner, The Scorchio String Quartet, Tenzin Kunsel, Bajah + the Dry Eye Crew, Stephen Colbert, New Order, and many others. Opening 2021's online, live stream 34th benefit, the Dalai Lama sent a video message of congratulation and thanks to Tibet House US, Bob and Nena Thurman, and those who started Tibet House in New York. He also thanked Sogpo (Mongolian) Wangyal, the late Geshe Wangyal, Thurman's teacher, for also contributing to advocating Tibetan Buddhism among Americans. In 2022, after Keanu Reeves appeared in the virtual 35th year benefit concert reciting the Beat Poem "Pull My Daisy," social media users in China suggested a boycott of his films. "Despite his past close collaboration with its film authorities and decades of mega-stardom spanning the length of the country’s engagement with Hollywood," due to backlash from Chinese nationalists over his appearance in support of THUS, his films have "reportedly been scrubbed from China streaming platforms such as Tencent Video, Youku and Migu Video."

Collections
THUS collects and displays diverse examples of Tibetan sacred, fine, and folk arts, with the hope to ultimately repatriate them to a National Museum in  Tibet. Since the Chinese communist occupation of Tibet beginning in 1949, the majority of these artworks and Buddhist manuscripts were destroyed during the Cultural Revolution, and to a much lesser degree by the Younghusband Expedition, a temporary invasion of Tibet by the British, part of the ongoing "Great Game," and by archaeological looting.

The Repatriation Collection and the Old Tibet Photographic Archive were founded in 1992. The Old Tibet Photographic Archive started with the gift of missionary Marion Grant Griebenow's over 3,000 images and journal writings from Tibet in 1928–1949, and contains work by photographers Hugh Richardson, Heinrich Harrer, Fosco Maraini, David McDonald, and Lt. J. R. Weir; photographs from the Tokan Tada collection from the Toyo Bunko Library in Tokyo, Japan, taken in Central Tibet, Amdo, and Sikkim in the 1920s, and images from the A.T. Steele Collection. The Repatriation Collection consists of over 1500 thangkas, bronzes, ritual objects, and folk art. These archives document the destruction of over 6000 monasteries, temples, historic buildings, and the contents that were pillaged; "The monasteries, however, were not only centers of scholasticism (although that was certainly the hallmark of Drepung, Sera and Ganden). They were also centers for the study of painting, sculpture, embroidery, music, dance, chant and ritual. They were the repositories of the treasures of Tibetan art and the libraries of the vast Tibetan literature."

Selected publications

  Worlds of Transformation: Tibetan Art of Wisdom and Compassion, Marylin Rhie and Robert Thurman, essay by David Jackson, co-published with the Rubin Museum, Harry N. Abrams Co., 1991, 
  Mandala: The Architecture of Enlightenment, Denise P. Leidy, Robert Thurman., first edition published with Asia Society and Shambhala Publications, thereafter Overlook Press, 1997, 
  Wisdom and Compassion: The Sacred Art of Tibet, Marylin Rhie and Robert Thurman, co-published with Harry N. Abrams Co., 1991 – 1998 in English, German, Spanish, Catalan, Japanese, and Chinese; 2000, 
  The Tibetan Wheel of Existence, Jacqueline Dunnington, 2000, 
 Visions of Tibet: Outer, Inner, Secret, photographs by Brian Kistler, introduction by Robert Thurman, ed. Thomas Yarnell, Overlook Duckworth, 2005, 
 Vanishing Tibet, Catherine Steinmann and Danny Conant, 2008, 
  A Shrine For Tibet: The Alice S. Kandell Collection, Marylin Rhie & Robert Thurman, Overlook Press, 2010, 
  Man of Peace: The Illustrated Life Story of the Dalai Lama of Tibet, graphic novel, William Meyers, Robert Thurman, Michael G. Burbank, initiated artistically by Rabkar Wangchuk, art a team effort of five artists coordinated by Steve Buccellato and Michael Burbank,

Translations and scholarly works 

 The Treasury of Buddhist Sciences, series, editors, Robert Thurman, Thomas Yarnall and The Treasury of Indic Sciences, series, editors Robert Thurman, Gary Tubb and Thomas Yarnall, co-published with the American Institute of Buddhist Studies and the Columbia University Center for Buddhist Studies; Columbia University Press:
  Universal Vehicle Discourse Literature, Lozang Jamspal, et al., 2004, 
  Kalacakra Tantra: Chapter on the Individual, Vesna Wallace, 2004, 
  Nagarjuna’s Reason Sixty, Joseph Loizzo, et al., 2007, 
  Kalacakra Tantra: The Sadhana Chapter, Vesna Wallace, 2010, 
  Tsong Khapa’s Extremely Brilliant Lamp, Robert Thurman, 2010, 
  The Range of the Bodhisattva, Lozang Jamspal, 2010, 
  Consciousness, Knowledge, and Ignorance, Bina Gupta, 2011,

With Hay House 

  My Appeal to the World, 14th Dalai Lama, Sofia Stril-Rever, compiler, Robert Thurman, foreword, 2015, 
  The Dalai Lama and the King Demon: Tracking a Triple Murder Mystery Through the Mists of Time, Raimondo Bultrini, 2013, 
  A Drop from the Marvelous Ocean of History, Lelung Tulku Rinpoche XI, 2013,

Film 
  His Holiness the Great 14th Dalai Lama of Tibet recorded a video message for the 34th annual benefit concert of Tibet House US, Office of His Holiness the Dalai Lama  
 First 30 Years of Tibet House
 God and Buddha: A Dialogue with Deepak Chopra and Robert Thurman, Mystic Fire Video, ASIN: B0000C23DQ
 Robert A. F. Thurman on Buddhism, Wellspring, ASIN: B00005Y721

See also

 14th Dalai Lama
 Dalai Lama
 Tibetan people
 Tibetan Buddhism
 Tibetan art
 Tibetan Sovereignty Debate
 Government of Tibet in Exile
 List of organizations of Tibetans in exile
 1959 Tibetan uprising
 British expedition to Tibet
 Sinicization of Tibet

References

External links

 Tibet House US
 First 30 Years of Tibet House
 Tibet House US Video Library
 Tibet House US Channel,vimeo 
 Tibet House US Menla Online
 History of Tibet & the 13th Dalai Lama’s Flag
 Keanu Reeves performs "Pull My Daisy," 35th Annual Tibet House Benefit Concert, March 3, 2022
 The Dalai Lama Meeting with Members of Tibet House US, October 21, 2022 

Asian art museums in New York (state)
Tibet
Tibetology
Tibetan-American culture
Columbia University
Cultural studies organizations
Cultural heritage of China
Ethnic museums in New York City
Museums in Manhattan
Museums in New York City
Society museums in New York (state)
Oral tradition
Traditional medicine
Traditional knowledge
Art and cultural repatriation
Art museums and galleries in New York City
Cultural heritage
Museums established in 1987
Conservation and restoration organizations
Historic preservation organizations
Historic preservation